Multi-pitch climbing is the ascent of climbing routes with one or more stops at a belay station. Each section of a climb between stops at belay stations is called a pitch. The leader ascends the pitch, placing gear and stopping to anchor themselves to the belay station.

The general purpose of these stops is to allow the second climber to ascend to the point of the lead climber while collecting the protective gear from the route in the course of the lead climber's ascent. At the belay station, the protective gear is collected, possibly exchanged to a new leader, and the leader of the next pitch ascends the route.

Reasons for invoking stops
Climbers invoke stops either by choice, convention or necessity.  Examples include:
The rope is too short to do the entire route in one pitch.
The leader has run out of protective gear.
There is a convenient protectable ledge, or fixed bolts placed by previous climbers, at the location for a belay station.
The leader chooses to rest or exchange leads before the next pitch.

See also
Big wall climbing

References

Types of climbing